Geophis dunni,  Dunn's earth snake, is a species of enigmatic snake in the family Colubridae. The species is presumably endemic to Nicaragua and is only known from a single specimen discovered in 1932. This specimen, the holotype,  was discovered by Karl Patterson Schmidt in the stomach of a Central American coral snake,  and no additional specimen has been seen since. It is part of the Geophis sieboldi species group according to Floyd Leslie Downs. This species was named by Schmidt after fellow herpetologist Emmett Reid Dunn "in allusion to his important contributions to our knowledge of this group of snakes".

This species is little known for several reasons. Snakes of the genus Geophis are fossorial and nocturnal, and as such are rarely observed in their natural habitat even by those actively searching for them. Also, the snakes of this genus form extensive species complexes in which the only way to tell them apart is by slight differences. For example, Geophis dunni differs from other species by having 17 dorsal scale rows, 8 infralabial scales, and 140 ventral scales. Additionally, the type locality given by Schmidt is very vague, only being "Matagalpa, Nicaragua". Matagalpa is both a city and a municipality, and no data for elevation or habitat type were specified either. As of 2022, Geophis dunni remains "data deficient" until another individual is collected and a habitat is identified.

Reproduction
G. dunni is oviparous.

References

Geophis
Snakes of Central America
Reptiles of Nicaragua
Endemic fauna of Nicaragua
Taxa named by Karl Patterson Schmidt
Reptiles described in 1932
Species known from a single specimen